The 2017 Middle Tennessee Blue Raiders football team represented Middle Tennessee State University as a member of the East Division of Conference USA (C-USA) during the 2017 NCAA Division I FBS football season. Led by 12th-year head coach Rick Stockstill, the Blue Raiders compiled an overall record of 7–6 with a mark of 4–4 in conference play, tying for third place in the C-USA's East Division. Middle Tennessee was invited to the Camellia Bowl, where they defeated Arkansas State. The team played home games at Johnny "Red" Floyd Stadium in Murfreesboro, Tennessee.

Previous season
The Blue Raiders finished the 2016 season 8–5, 5–3 in C-USA play to finish in third place in the East Division. They received a bid to the Hawaii Bowl where they lost to Hawaii.

Schedule
Middle Tennessee announced its 2017 football schedule on January 26, 2017. The 2017 schedule consisted of six home and six away games in the regular season.

Game summaries

Vanderbilt

at Syracuse

at Minnesota

Bowling Green

at Florida Atlantic

FIU

at UAB

Marshall

UTEP

at Charlotte

at WKU

Old Dominion

vs Arkansas State–Camellia Bowl

References

Middle Tennessee
Middle Tennessee Blue Raiders football seasons
Camellia Bowl champion seasons
Middle Tennessee Blue Raiders football